Tania Evans (born 28 May 1967) is a British singer and songwriter. She gained popularity during her participation in the German Eurodance group Culture Beat from 1993 to 1997.

Career
Evans' first release was the single "Can't Let Go" in 1992 on C.T Records. Shortly after, she replaced Lana Earl in Culture Beat and found immediate success with their single "Mr. Vain", with Evans on vocals. "Mr. Vain" became Culture Beat's most successful single, reaching No. 1 in 13 countries. Evans also sang vocals on the singles "Got to Get It", "Anything", "World in Your Hands", "Inside Out", "Crying in the Rain" (which she co-wrote), "Walk the Same Line" and "Take Me Away" with Culture Beat, before she was replaced by Kim Sanders in 1997.

After leaving Culture Beat, Evans released a solo single entitled "Prisoner of Love" which she composed with Peter Ries. The single includes a remix by Hendrick Schimann and Mike Romeo. It was released by Columbia/Sony Music and reached the top 10 on the U.S. Billboard Club Dance chart and No. 75 in Germany. She also appeared on Kosmonova's single "Singing in My Mind" in 1998, which reached No. 78 in Germany.

In 2003, Evans released a house-style single entitled "Strength to Carry On" on Dos or Die Recordings.

References

Eurodance musicians
1967 births
Living people
20th-century Black British women singers
English people of Jamaican descent
British expatriates in Germany
English women in electronic music
People from Edmonton, London
Singers from London